Despicable Me 2 is a 2013 American computer-animated comedy film produced by Illumination Entertainment and distributed by Universal Pictures. The sequel to Despicable Me (2010), it was directed by Chris Renaud and Pierre Coffin, and written by Cinco Paul and Ken Daurio. Despicable Me 2 stars the voices of Steve Carell, Kristen Wiig, Benjamin Bratt, Miranda Cosgrove, Russell Brand, and Ken Jeong. The film follows Gru (Carell) as he is recruited by agent Lucy Wilde (Wiig), who is investigating a theft of the mutagen called PX-41, stolen from the Arctic Circle. During their investigations, they extract Eduardo Pérez / El Macho (Bratt), a supervillain with the goal of causing world domination after faking his death.

Despicable Me 2 debuted in Australia on June 5, 2013, and was released in the United States on July 3. Made on a production budget of $76million, Despicable Me 2 earned $970.8million worldwide, finishing its theatrical run as the third-highest-grossing film of 2013. On the review aggregator website Rotten Tomatoes, the film holds an approval rating of  based on  reviews.

Despicable Me 2 and its soundtrack have received various awards and nominations. The film garnered a Golden Globe nomination at the 71st ceremony. Despicable Me 2 won one of ten nominations at the 41st Annie Awards. At the 86th Academy Awards, the film received two Oscar nominations, including Best Animated Feature and Best Original Song (for "Happy").

Accolades

Notes

References

External links
 

Despicable Me
Lists of accolades by film
NBCUniversal-related lists